Nikolayev, also spelled Nikolaev, or Nikolayeva (feminine; Николаева), is a Russian last name that is derived from the male given name Nikolay and literally means Nikolay's. It may refer to:

Aleksey Nikolayev (disambiguation)
Alene Nikolayev, Bulgarian civic society leader
Alexander Fedorovich Nikolayev, Soviet Air Force officer, test pilot and Hero of the Soviet Union
Alexander Nikolayev, Red Army officer and Hero of the Soviet Union
Andrian Nikolayev, Soviet cosmonaut
Aysen Nikolayev, Russian politician of Yakut ethnicity, Head of the Sakha Republic
Igor Nikolayev, Russian pop singer and composer
Konstantin Nikolaev, Russian billionaire, Russian investor in American Ethane & financial supporter of Maria Butina
Leonid Nikolaev, Russian communist, the assassin of Sergei Kirov
Leonid Vladimirovich Nikolayev, Russian pianist, composer, and pedagogue
Mikhail Nikolayev, Russian politician and deputy of the State Duma
Mikhail Arkhipovich Nikolayev, Soviet sergeant and posthumous Hero of the Soviet Union
Mikhail Vasilyevich Nikolayev, Soviet army officer and Hero of the Soviet Union
Nikita Nikolayev, Russian association football player
Nikolay Nikolaev — several people
Olga Nikolaeva, Russian volleyball player
Sergei Nikolayev (disambiguation)
Tatiana Nikolayeva, Russian pianist
Victoria Nikolaeva, Russian politician
Viktor Arsenievich Nikolaev (1893–1960), Russian and Soviet geologist
Vladimir Nikolayev (disambiguation), several people
Yelena Nikolayeva (disambiguation), several people
Yevgeni Nikolayev, Soviet army officer and Hero of the Soviet Union

Russian-language surnames
Surnames from given names